Dinocrocuta is an extinct genus of hyena-like feliform carnivores. It lived in Asia, and Africa, during the Miocene epoch. It had very strong jaws that were able to crush bones.

Description

Size

However, the method used has been known to overestimate the masses of extinct carnivorans. The other species were smaller in size, but still quite large compared to hyena species alive today.

Distribution
Dinocrocuta had a large range and ruled most of the Eurasia and some parts of Africa. D. gigantea ranged from Central China to Spain, and encompassed areas in between, like Mongolia, India, Pakistan, Iran, Turkey, Bulgaria, and Greece. D. algeriensis managed to make its way to North Africa, and D. senyureki originated in the Tibet region.

Ecology

Dinocrocuta was an exceptionally powerful predator and scavenger, capable of preying on animals much larger than itself. Though it is currently unknown if Dinocrocuta was solitary or social, it was probably an able hunter of such animals as the tusked rhinoceros Chilotherium. Chilotherium, despite its great size, was vulnerable to the giant feliform, particularly when it was giving birth, or was injured or sick. A skull and jaw from a female Chilotherium bears the distinctive bite marks on the forehead from a Dinocrocuta teeth, indicating that the rhino was part of the carnivore's diet. The regrowth of bone on the rhino's injuries also indicate that the Dinocrocuta attempt at predation failed and that the rhinoceros fought off her attacker, managing to escape and heal.

References

Miocene feliforms
Hyenas
Neogene animals of Asia
Neogene animals of Africa
Fossil taxa described in 1975
Prehistoric carnivoran genera